Commoneria is a genus of moths of the family Tortricidae.

Species
Commoneria cyanosticha (Turner, 1946)

See also
List of Tortricidae genera

References

External links
tortricidae.com

Tortricidae genera
Taxa named by Marianne Horak
Olethreutinae